Mary Price "Pricey" Harrison (born August 31, 1958) is an American attorney and politician from North Carolina. Harrison is a Democratic member of the North Carolina House of Representatives, having first been elected in 2004. She has represented the 61st District (and the preceding 57th District) (including constituents in central Guilford County) since 2005.

Early life and career
Raised in Greensboro, North Carolina, Harrison earned a bachelor’s degree from Duke University and a Juris Doctor from the University of North Carolina at Chapel Hill. Prior to joining the NC House of Representatives, she worked as a civil litigation and Communications Law attorney.  A noted civic leader, she has served as President of the Julian Price Family Foundation, and in leadership with the NC Environmental Defense Fund and the Piedmont Land Conservancy.

Harrison was first elected to the North Carolina House of Representatives in 2004. Harrison has been recognized as a leader on environmental issues, clean energy, and green jobs in North Carolina. She has received commendation for her work as Vice Chair of the legislative committees on both the Environment and Judiciary.

Committee assignments

2021-2022 session
Appropriations
Appropriations - Agriculture and Natural and Economic Resources
Environment (Vice Chair)
Election Law and Campaign Finance Reform
Energy and Public Utilities
Judiciary I
Marine Resources and Aqua Culture
Redistricting

2019-2020 session
Appropriations
Appropriations - Agriculture and Natural and Economic Resources
Environment (Vice Chair)
Election Law and Campaign Finance Reform
Energy and Public Utilities
Judiciary
Redistricting

2017-2018 session
Appropriations
Appropriations - Agriculture and Natural and Economic Resources
Environment (Vice Chair)
Elections and Ethics Law
Energy and Public Utilities
Judiciary II
Alcoholic Beverage Control
Regulatory Reform

2015-2016 session
Appropriations
Appropriations - Agriculture and Natural and Economic Resources
Environment (Vice Chair)
Judiciary III (Vice Chair)
Elections
Public Utilities
Regulatory Reform

2013-2014 session
Appropriations
Environment
Elections
Public Utilities
Judiciary

2011-2012 session
Appropriations
Environment
Elections
Public Utilities
Judiciary

2009-2010 session
Appropriations
Environment and Natural Resources
Election Law and Campaign Finance Reform
Public Utilities
Energy and Energy Efficiency
Judiciary I
Marine Resources and Aquaculture
Ethics

Electoral history

2020

2018

2016

2014

2012

2010

2008

2006

2004

References

External links
North Carolina General Assembly - Representative Pricey Harrison official NC House website
Project Vote Smart - Representative Mary Price 'Pricey' Harrison (NC) profile
Follow the Money - Mary Price (Pricey) Harrison
2008 2006 2004 campaign contributions
 Biography from Rep. Harrison's personal site

|-

Living people
1958 births
People from Greensboro, North Carolina
Duke University alumni
University of North Carolina School of Law alumni
North Carolina lawyers
Democratic Party members of the North Carolina House of Representatives
21st-century American politicians
21st-century American women politicians
Women state legislators in North Carolina